"Can't Wait 'Til Christmas" is a song by Japanese singer-songwriter Hikaru Utada. It was released on Utada's second Japanese compilation album, Utada Hikaru Single Collection Vol. 2, on November 24, 2010.

Composition and inspiration 

The song was written by Hikaru Utada, and is the first Christmas song she has written. The song is a piano backed slow-paced ballad, sung in a higher register to the majority of Utada's songs. Other than piano, subtle background sounds are occasionally added into the instrument backing, such as occasional cymbal sounds. The lyrics describe a person in winter on Christmas Eve, who cannot wait for Christmas Day, however, asks why people want to chase after tomorrows instead of cherishing what they have now. The protagonist of the song has days filled with nothing to do at Christmas time, and feels that she wants to be close to her lover. She chides her lover for trying to act cool in front of her, but feels the distance between them growing less. She wants her lover to not promise her things for the future, and instead to listen to what she feels right in that moment.

The song was written for fans who expressed an interest in a Hikaru Utada-written Christmas song. Utada felt the shiest about this song being released out of the new songs written for Utada Hikaru Single Collection Vol. 2, as she had been trying to write a Christmas song for 1–2 years, but could not find the proper inspiration. Utada believed that the writing style used in "Can't Wait 'Til Christmas" is different to that of the rest of the new songs.

Promotion 

The song was used in an advertising commercial campaign for Pepsi Nex, her second successive Pepsi Nex commercial, after "Hymne à l'amour (Ai no Anthem)" in October. This is the first time Pepsi has used an original song in its recent advertisement campaign in Japan, as all of the other songs have been covers of Western songs. The commercials began airing from December 4 onwards. The commercials feature Utada singing the song in an outdoor wintery landscape, lying against an oversized Pepsi Nex bottle.

The song was performed during Utada's two date concert series Wild Life in December 2010.

Charts

Certifications

References 

2010 songs
Japanese Christmas songs
Hikaru Utada songs
Japanese-language songs
Pop ballads
RIAJ Digital Track Chart number-one singles
Songs used as jingles
Songs written by Hikaru Utada
2010s ballads